Paraspheniscoides binarius is a species of tephritid or fruit flies in the genus Paraspheniscoides of the family Tephritidae.

Distribution
Ethiopia South to Namibia & South Africa, Madagascar, Mauritius, Réunion.

References

Tephritinae
Insects described in 1861
Diptera of Africa